All Fall Down is an album by American ska-punk band Against All Authority. The album was released in 1998.

Track listing
"All Fall Down" – 2:11
"12:00 AM" – 2:38
"Justification" – 2:16
"Keep Trying" – 1:47
"At Our Expense" – 2:15
"Stand in Line" – 2:03
"Toby" – 1:16
"We Don't Need You" – 1:33
"The Mayhem & the Pain" – 1:51
"Louder Than Words" – 2:02
"What the Fuck'd You Expect?" – 2:15
"Daddy's Little Girl" – 1:21
"Sk8 Rock" – 1:39
"Watered Down & Passive" – 1:59
"When the Rain Begins to Fall" – 1:50

Artwork by Omar Angulo

Legal problems
In the inlay of this CD, there is a scanned letter from the American Automobile Association (from 1998). Their trademark consists of three As in an oval. They complained to Hopeless Records that the logo Against All Authority uses is the same as theirs, and they threatened to sue the label.
After this, Against All Authority's logo was changed and previous CDs with the offending logo were replaced with the new one. However, in response to this argument their next album was entitled 24 Hour Roadside Resistance, making fun of the American Automobile Association's slogan "24 Hour Roadside Assistance".

References

1998 albums
Against All Authority albums
Hopeless Records albums